Grahams Beach is a rural settlement on the northern tip of the Āwhitu Peninsula and south coast of the Manukau Harbour in the Auckland Region of New Zealand. The settlement as defined by Statistics New Zealand also includes Big Bay and Orua Bay.

Once known as Graham's Beach, it was on a ferry route between Waiuku and Onehunga in 1895. A wharf was built in about 1903. A primary school opened at Orua Bay in 1896, and another flourished in Graham's Beach around 1927. Both schools closed in 1949 when rural schools in the area were consolidated to Awhitu District School.

Demographics
Grahams Beach is part of the larger Āwhitu statistical area.

Grahams Beach had a population of 135 at the 2018 New Zealand census, a decrease of 6 people (−4.3%) since the 2013 census, and a decrease of 15 people (−10.0%) since the 2006 census. There were 66 households, comprising 72 males and 66 females, giving a sex ratio of 1.09 males per female, with 18 people (13.3%) aged under 15 years, 12 (8.9%) aged 15 to 29, 63 (46.7%) aged 30 to 64, and 45 (33.3%) aged 65 or older.

Ethnicities were 95.6% European/Pākehā, 8.9% Māori, 2.2% Pacific peoples, 2.2% Asian, and 4.4% other ethnicities. People may identify with more than one ethnicity.

Although some people chose not to answer the census's question about religious affiliation, 55.6% had no religion and 33.3% were Christian.

Of those at least 15 years old, 12 (10.3%) people had a bachelor's or higher degree, and 27 (23.1%) people had no formal qualifications. 9 people (7.7%) earned over $70,000 compared to 17.2% nationally. The employment status of those at least 15 was that 36 (30.8%) people were employed full-time, and 15 (12.8%) were part-time.

Notes

Populated places around the Manukau Harbour
Populated places in the Auckland Region